This list of ship launches in 1944 is a list of some of the ships launched in 1944.

January

February

March

April

May

June

July

August

September

October

November

December

Unknown date

References

Sources
 
 

1944
Ship launches